Joseph-François Poeymirau (8 November 1869 – 22 February 1924) was a French general.

Childhood
Poeymirau was born in Pau, Pyrénées-Atlantiques on 8 November 1869 and was the son of André Adolphe Poeymirau, a businessman, and his wife Delphine Rocacher. He studied at the Collège Stanislas de Paris, then the Military School of Saint-Cyr Coetquidan before being accepted to the War College.

French conquest of Morocco
Poeymirau commanded 30,000 men and reported initial success in his 1920 expeditions.

References

1869 births
1924 deaths
French generals
People from Pau, Pyrénées-Atlantiques
French military personnel of World War I